Lalu Bhulu is a 1983 Bangladeshi drama film starring Razzak and Sohel Rana as two brothers Lalu and Bhulu. The film is based on a same name novel of Dr. Nihar Ranjan Gupta. Sohel Rana garnered his lone Bangladesh National Film Award for Best Actor for his performance in the film.

Cast 
 Sohel Rana as Lalu
 Razzak as Bhulu
 Golam Mustafa
 Shabana
 Anwar Hossain
 Darashiko

Track listing 
"Tomra Jara Aaj Amader" - Khurshid Alam
"Dosti Jodi Chao" - Khurshid Alam

Awards 
Bangladesh National Film Awards
Best Actor - Sohel Rana
 Best Director -  Kamal Ahmed

External links

References

1983 films
Bengali-language Bangladeshi films
Films scored by Subal Das
Films directed by Kamal Ahmed (director)
1980s Bengali-language films
Films based on works by Nihar Ranjan Gupta